Yemeni Revolution generally refers to the 2011 Yemeni Revolution, but may also refer to:
Alwaziri coup of 1947
1962 coup d'état in North Yemen
2014–15 Yemeni coup d'état